Schütter is a surname. Notable people with the surname include:

David Schütter (born 1991), German actor
Friedrich Schütter (1921–1995), German actor
Meinrad Schütter (1910–2006), Swiss composer

German-language surnames